The 2017 Pan American Road Cycling Championships took place at Santo Domingo, Dominican Republic, May 4–7, 2017. This was the 32nd edition of the continental championship. The event gave berths for the 2018 Central American and Caribbean Games.

Medal summary

Men

Women

Under 23 Men

Under 23 Women

Results

Men elite road race

References

Americas
Cycling
Pan American Road and Track Championships
International cycle races hosted by the Dominican Republic